Georgia Girl may refer to:

"Georgia Girl", a song by Freddy Weller recorded in 1973
"Georgia Girl", a song by Collective Soul, for their Afterwords 2007 album